Tahvili Intersection is an intersection in south central Shiraz, Iran. It is the junction between Harraf Street, Tahvili Street and Laleh Street. It leads to Basij (Old Airport) Square from west and Artesh Square from east.

Transportation

Streets
 Harrafi Street
 Tahvili Street
 Laleh Street

Buses
 Route 4
 Route 91

Streets in Shiraz